Laurenţiu Diniţă (born 29 March 1975 in Bucharest) is a Romanian former football player and currently a manager.

Personal life
Laurenţiu Diniță is the father of football player Roberto Diniță.

Honours
Sportul Studențesc
Liga II: 2000–01
Steaua București
Liga I: 2004–05

Coaching stats

References

External links

Living people
1975 births
Footballers from Bucharest
Romanian footballers
Association football forwards
Liga I players
Liga II players
Cypriot First Division players
CSM Jiul Petroșani players
FC Steaua București players
FC Sportul Studențesc București players
Aris Limassol FC players
CS Concordia Chiajna players
Romanian football managers
CS Concordia Chiajna managers
CS Balotești managers
Romanian expatriate footballers
Expatriate footballers in Cyprus
Romanian expatriate sportspeople in Cyprus